Popov Plant is a company based in Nizhniy Novgorod, Russia.

The Popov Plant has been engaged in radioelectronic work since 1952 and has particular expertise in aircraft-related systems and electronic medical equipment. It manufactures ground and airborne aviation radio communications equipment and complexes, radio centers, MF and HF radio stations of various applications.

References

External links
 Official website

Electronics companies of Russia
Manufacturing companies based in Nizhniy Novgorod
Manufacturing companies of the Soviet Union
Companies nationalised by the Soviet Union
Ministry of the Communications Equipment Industry (Soviet Union)
Electronics companies of the Soviet Union
Defence companies of the Soviet Union